Top is a surname of a variety of origins, including Dutch, Yiddish, and Turkish. In Dutch, the name may be a patronymic or have referred to the top of someone's head, e.g. a hairstyle. In Yiddish, top means "pot" and is metonymic for a potter. People with this surname include:

Brent L. Top (born 1953), American Mormon missionary and professor in moral education
Damien Top (born 1963), French tenor, musicologist and conductor
Edward Top (born 1972), Dutch classical composer
Hennie Top (born 1956), Dutch racing cyclist
Edwina Tops-Alexander (born 1974), Australian equestrian, wife of Jan Tops
Emmanuel Top (born 1971), French acid techno music producer
Jan Tops (born 1961), Dutch equestrian
Jannick Top (born 1947), French bass player and composer
Jonathan Top (born 1993), American soccer player
Lisa Top (born 1996), Dutch artistic gymnast
Luke Top (born 1980), Israeli-born American afro-pop musician
Noordin Mohammad Top (1968–2009), Malaysian Muslim extremist
Peleg Top (born 1967), Israeli graphic designer
Refik Osman Top (1897–1957), Turkish footballer, referee, coach and sports columnist
Ronald Top (born 1960), Dutch actor, director and producer

See also
Carrot Top, stage name of Scott Thompson (born 1965),  American stand-up comedian

References

Dutch-language surnames
Turkish-language surnames
Yiddish-language surnames